This is a list of listed buildings in Glasgow. The list is split out in smaller parts.

 List of Category A listed buildings in Glasgow

Comprehensive lists of Category A, B and C buildings:

 List of listed buildings in Glasgow/1
 List of listed buildings in Glasgow/2
 List of listed buildings in Glasgow/3
 List of listed buildings in Glasgow/4
 List of listed buildings in Glasgow/5
 List of listed buildings in Glasgow/6
 List of listed buildings in Glasgow/7
 List of listed buildings in Glasgow/8
 List of listed buildings in Glasgow/9
 List of listed buildings in Glasgow/10
 List of listed buildings in Glasgow/11
 List of listed buildings in Glasgow/12
 List of listed buildings in Glasgow/13

Glasgow